Elial Todd Foote (May 1, 1796 – November 17, 1877) was an American physician, politician, jurist and historian. He was the judge of Chautauqua County, New York, from 1824 to 1844. Previously, he had three terms in the New York State Assembly (1819–1820, 1826–1827).

Biography

Early life and career
Foote was born in Gill, Massachusetts, as the eldest of the 11 children of Samuel Foote (1770–1848) and Eliza Doolittle Foote (1777–1832). In 1798, his family moved to Sherburne, New York. Here, his father pruchased land and operated a tavern.

Foote studied medicine under Dr. Guthrie and attended medical lectures in New York City. In 1815, he was licensed as a doctor by the Chenango County Medical Society. In the same year, he moved to Jamestown, New York, to begin a medical practice as the new settlement's first physician. He later abandoned the practice and turned to politics. He was married to Anna Cheney (1800–1840) and they had five children. 

In 1822, he purchased 350 acres from the Holland Land Company on which he built his home the following year. This is now the site of the Jamestown High School, which is noted on a historical marker.

Politics
Foote was elected to the New York State Assembly in 1819, representing Chautauqua, Cattaraugus, and Niagara counties in the 43rd New York State Legislature in 1819–1820. He was again elected to the Assembly in 1825, to the 49th New York State Legislature in 1826, and again elected in 1826, to the 50th New York State Legislature in 1827. In the latter two terms, he represented Chautauqua County.

Foote was an associate judge of Chautauqua County in 1817 and judge of the Court of Common Pleas for Chautauqua County from 1818 to 1823, Jamestown postmaster in 1819, Chautauqua county sheriff in 1820 and county judge of Chautauqua County from 1824 to 1844.

Foote was an abolitionist and his papers associated with his antislavery work are preserved by the Chautauqua County Historical Society in its McClurg Museum in Westfield, New York.

Later life
After his first wife died in 1840, he married Amelia Stiles Leavitt Jenkins. She was the daughter of Jonathan Leavitt and granddaughter of Ezra Stiles. In 1845, they moved from Jamestown to New Haven, Connecticut. He died there in 1877 and was buried in Lake View Cemetery in Jamestown, New York.

References

External links

Elial T. Foote Papers at the McClurg Museum in Westfield, New York

1796 births
1877 deaths
American abolitionists
American judges
Members of the New York State Assembly